Phu Pha Daeng Wildlife Sanctuary is a wildlife sanctuary in Lom Sak District of Thailand's Phetchabun Province.

Geography
This part of the Phetchabun Mountains has several small streams, which are tributaries of the Pa Sak River.

Topography
Landscape is mostly covered by forested mountains, such as Phu Luak, Khao Khok Dein Thasi, Khao Khun Nam Phai and Khao Wang Han. The total forested area is 98%, divided into 66% high slope mountain area (mountain tops, high ridges, deeply incised streams, shallow valleys, upper slopes and local ridges) and 32% hill slope area (open slopes, midslope ridges and u-shaped valleys).

Flora
The sanctuary features mixed deciduous forest (75%), dry deciduous forest (15%), conifer forest (5%), agricultural area (2%) and bamboo forest (2%).

Fauna
Mammals in the sanctuary are:

Location

See also
 List of protected areas of Thailand
 List of Protected Areas Regional Offices of Thailand

References

Wildlife sanctuaries of Thailand
Geography of Phetchabun province
Tourist attractions in Phetchabun province
Phetchabun Mountains